Star Cigar is an internationally-distributed brand of cigars and accessories manufactured in the Dominican Republic. Fran “Shon” Shatone Brooks invented the product and introduced it to the United States in May 2013. Robusto cigars are created from a mixture of Dominican tobacco leaves. They are finished with a round cap.

Smoke Magazine Review and Hard Rock Casino Debut
In March 2014, less than a year after it was introduced to consumers, S.O.B. Robusto was featured in Smoke Magazine, cigarweekly (The limited Shon Brooks "Star Cigar" becomes one of the highest rated cigars on the planet.), a quarterly lifestyle publication for cigar enthusiasts.  The cigar received ratings between 87 and 95 on a 100-point rating scale, which represent very good to excellent scores.

In 2014, Brooks secured an agreement with Hard Rock to retail the cigars in the five-star Hard Rock Casino in Punta Cana, Dominican Republic.

This brand was created for the ‘vanquisher’ in making wise choices and decisions in life. Here is a cigar made for the gifted critical thinker and extreme competitor.

References

Cigar brands